Whitsunday Airport (Shute Harbour)  is located in Flametree in the Whitsunday Region, Queensland, Australia. It is located between the popular tourist destinations of Airlie Beach, Shute Harbour  and the Whitsunday Islands. 

The airport's runway has a  asphalt surface.

See also
 List of airports in Queensland

References

External links

 

Airports in Queensland
Whitsunday Islands
Whitsunday Region